Dean Park Historic Residential District is a national historic district located at Fort Myers, Florida in Lee County. Its context is very similar to the one in the early 1920s, when the district was built.

It was added to the National Register of Historic Places in 2013.

Location and climate

History

Landmarks and features

Further reading 
Dean Park Historic District web site
Fort Myers' historic Dean Park celebrates 100 years

References

National Register of Historic Places in Lee County, Florida
Historic districts on the National Register of Historic Places in Florida
Buildings and structures in Fort Myers, Florida